Jashore, traditionally spelled as Jessore and also known as Chandecan, is an ancient locality of Bengal and a district of modern Bangladesh located at the Southwest border of the country, just across Bangaon in the Indian state of West Bengal. 
Nestled close to the Sundarbans, Jashore experienced human settlement early on.
 
Khan Jahan Ali in mid-15th century traveled to the region and established the township Murali-Qasba. It was situated near a number of little towns such as Bogchar. He built a road to connect them all (now known as Khanjalir Jangal).

After the fall of the Hussain Shahi dynasty, Bengal experienced political fragmentation. Jashore saw establishment of a local dynasty. During the so-called twelve-lord period of Bengal, Pratapaditya was a quasi-independent ruler of Jashore who built up a significant local military force including a large fleet. Following the invasions of Man Singh and Islam Khan Chishti, the rein of Jashore passed to new landlords sanctioned by the Mughal empire. Pratapaditya was portrayed in various poetic, semi-legendary, or hagiographic works by authors like Bharat Chandra, Ramram Basu, and Sarala Devi Chaudhurani, among others.

During the reign of Murshid Quli Khan, the local landlord of Jashore called Sitaram Roy revolted against the Mughal rule, but was defeated by the imperial forces.

Jashore saw significant architectural constructions, especially Islamic mosques and Hindu temples. The Mirzanagar Hammam Khana (bathing house) was constructed by the local Mughal administrator (Faujdar) in Keshavpur, Jashore in circa 1649 CE. The Chachra Shiv temple for example is an eight-eaves (at-chala) temple dedicated to the Lord Shiva that was constructed by the local landlord Manohar in 1696. The temple stands in the Jashore sadar today. A church was set up by Catholic Jesuit priests in Jashore in around 1600, the first ever church in East Bengal. 
 
After the establishment of British colonial rule, Jashore was declared as a separate district for the British administrative system. The famous Bengali author Bankim Chandra Chattopadhyay served as the Deputy Collector and Deputy Magistrate of Jashore for some times. In 1868, the Jashore municipality (Paurasabha) was established. The district school was established in 1838, a public library in 1851, and an airport in the twenties-thirties of the twentieth century. A cantonment was set up in Jashore.

During the 1971 Bangladesh liberation war, the Jessore road was a key route of Bengali refugees streaming into India for shelter against the atrocities of the Pakistani military forces that occupied East Bengal. The poet Allen Ginsberg wrote his famous poem "September on Jessore Road" after visiting the refugee camps. On March 30, 1971, the Bengali soldiers in Jessore Cantonment revolted against the Pakistani regime. Bengali freedom fighters organized resistance in Jashore. In November 1971, a pitched battle was fought in Chaugachha between the Pak army and the Bangladeshi freedom fighters supported by the Indian allied forces, where the former was routed. On December 6, 1971, Jashore became the first district of Bangladesh to become independent.

References 

Jessore
Jashore District